Varner Township is an inactive township in Ripley County, in the U.S. state of Missouri.

Varner Townshipwas erected in 1890, taking its name from one Mr. Varner, an early settler.

References

Townships in Missouri
Townships in Ripley County, Missouri